Czerńczyce may refer to the following places in Poland:
Czerńczyce in Gmina Kąty Wrocławskie, Wrocław County in Lower Silesian Voivodeship (SW Poland)
Czerńczyce in Gmina Ziębice, Ząbkowice Śląskie County in Lower Silesian Voivodeship (SW Poland)